Anders Svensson (born 11 June 1975) is a Swedish bandy player who currently plays for Edsbyn as a goalkeeper.

Career

Club career
Svensson is a youth product of IFK Rättvik and has represented Ljusdal, IFK Rättvik, Edsbyn, Dynamo Kazan, and Volga.

International career
Svensson was part of Swedish World Champions teams of 2005, 2009, 2010, and 2012.

Honours

Country
 Sweden
 Bandy World Championship: 2005, 2009, 2010, 2012

References

External links
 
 

1975 births
Living people
Swedish bandy players
Ljusdals BK players
Edsbyns IF players
Sportspeople from Umeå
Dynamo Kazan players
Volga Ulyanovsk players
Expatriate bandy players in Russia
Sweden international bandy players
Bandy World Championship-winning players